Himantormia is a genus of lichenized fungi in the family Parmeliaceae. The genus, which contains two species, is found in Antarctica. The genus was circumscribed by British lichenologist Elke Mackenzie in 1964.

See also
List of Parmeliaceae genera

References

Parmeliaceae
Lichen genera
Lecanorales genera
Taxa described in 1964